Birds, Beasts, and Flowers can refer to:

 Birds, Beasts and Flowers, a book of poetry by D. H. Lawrence
 Birds, Beasts, & Flowers, a split EP by Hem and The Autumn Defense